Pelicula Films is a Vancouver and Montreal based production company which develops, produces and distributes films and documentaries

Pelicula was founded in 2010 by Oz Yilmaz (filmmaker) and is known for its documentaries focusing on local artists and cultural events

External links 
 Official Website

References 

Film production companies of Canada